{{DISPLAYTITLE:C5H4N4O}}
The molecular formula C5H4N4O (molar mass: 136.11 g/mol, exact mass: 136.0385 u) may refer to:

 Allopurinol
 1-Hydroxy-7-azabenzotriazole (HOAt)
 Hypoxanthine

Molecular formulas